YPL may refer to:
 Pickle Lake Airport
 Yunnan Provincial Library
 Yahoo! Public License